De'Juane Malachi Dunwood (born 1999), better known by his stage name DJ K.i.D, is an American record producer, DJ, and entrepreneur. He is best known for being a DJ for rapper DaBaby and producing multiple of his songs.

Early life 
Dunwood was born in Santa Clara, California.

Career 
Dunwood started DJ'ing for rapper DaBaby on September 1, 2018, at The Biggest Pregame Block Party at East Carolina University. The first song he produced for DaBaby was 
"Intro", which peaked at number 13 on the Billboard Hot 100.

Blame It on Baby, and engineered seven.

Other ventures 
Dunwood has also created his own brand of bottled water, titled K20 Water.

Production discography

Charted singles

References 

1999 births
American DJs
American producers
Living people